Comben Homes was a large British house builder.

History
The company was founded in 1907 by James White Comben and William Henry Wakeling as Comben & Wakeling and was incorporated as a private company in 1924. In 1972 it bought Ryedale Homes from Duncan Davidson for £1m and changed its name to Comben Group and subsequently traded as Comben Homes. It was acquired by Trafalgar House and integrated in its Ideal Homes housebuilding business in 1984.

References

Further reading
 

Housebuilding companies of the United Kingdom